The 2011–12 Cleveland Cavaliers season was the 42nd season of the franchise in the National Basketball Association (NBA).

Key dates
 May 17 – The 2011 NBA Draft Lottery took place, and the Cavaliers got the first pick.
 June 23 – The 2011 NBA draft took place in Newark, New Jersey, at the Prudential Center. The Cavaliers picked Kyrie Irving (#1), Tristan Thompson (#4), Milan Mačvan (#54). They also drafted Justin Harper (#32), but immediately traded him to the Orlando Magic for two future second-round picks (2013 and 2014).
 June 29 – The Cavs exercise the third-year option on Christian Eyenga, keeping him under contract until the 2012–13 season.
 June 30 – J.J. Hickson is sent to the Sacramento Kings, for Omri Casspi and a protected future first round pick.
 July 7 – The Cavaliers set an NBA D-League team in Canton, Ohio. The Cavs announced that they will own and control all the operations of the former Albuquerque/New Mexico Thunderbirds. On October 13, the new name, logo, colors and court design are unveiled, the Canton Charge.
 December 9 – Training Camp begins. The Cavs also signed with rookies Kyrie Irving and Tristan Thompson. They also waived Joey Graham.
 December 12 – Anthony Parker re-signed with the Cavaliers.
 December 14 – The Cavs decided to waive Baron Davis.
 December 16 – The Cavaliers opened their pre-season with a victory over the Detroit Pistons in The Palace of Auburn Hills.
 December 20 – The Cavs closed their pre-season with a loss against the Pistons in Quicken Loans Arena, with a 1-1 record.
 December 22 – Manny Harris is waived by the Cavs.
 December 26 – The Cavaliers opened their season with a loss against the Toronto Raptors in the Quicken Loans Arena.
 January 4 – Christian Eyenga is assigned to the Canton Charge.
 January 23 – The Cavs recall Christian Eyenga.
 February 10 – The Cavaliers sign a 10-day contract with Ben Uzoh, of the Rio Grande Valley Vipers.
 February 21 – Manny Harris sign a 10-day contract with the Cavs.

Draft picks

Roster

Pre-season

|- align="center" bgcolor="#ccffcc"
| 1
| December 16
| @ Detroit Pistons
| 
| Kyrie Irving (20)
| Alonzo Gee (8)
| Ramon Sessions (6)
| The Palace of Auburn Hills7,927
| 1-0
|- align="center" bgcolor="#ffcccc"
| 2
| December 20
| Detroit Pistons
| 
| Omri Casspi (18)
| Anderson Varejão (10)
| Ramon Sessions (8)
| Quicken Loans Arena9,853
| 1-1

The original 2011 NBA Pre-season was canceled due to the 2011 NBA Lockout. After the lockout, the NBA created a new two game Pre-Season.

Regular season

Standings

Record vs. opponents

Game log

|- bgcolor="#ffcccc"
| 1
| December 26
| Toronto
| 
| Ramon Sessions (18)
| Anderson Varejão (10)
| Kyrie Irving (7)
| Quicken Loans Arena  20,562
| 0–1
|- bgcolor="#ccffcc"
| 2
| December 28
| @ Detroit
| 
| Samardo Samuels (17)
| Anderson Varejão, Ramon Sessions (7)
| Kyrie Irving (7)
| The Palace of Auburn Hills  22,076
| 1–1
|- bgcolor="#ffcccc"
| 3
| December 30
| @ Indiana
| 
| Kyrie Irving (20)
| Anderson Varejão (13)
| Kyrie Irving, Alonzo Gee (4)
| Bankers Life Fieldhouse  13,004
| 1–2

|- bgcolor="#ccffcc"
| 4
| January 1
| New Jersey
| 
| Antawn Jamison (23)
| Anderson Varejão (11)
| Ramon Sessions (8)
| Quicken Loans Arena  15,084
| 2–2
|- bgcolor="#ccffcc"
| 5
| January 3
| Charlotte
| 
| Kyrie Irving (20)
| Tristan Thompson (9)
| Ramon Sessions (9)
| Quicken Loans Arena  14,173
| 3–2
|- bgcolor="#ffcccc"
| 6
| January 4
| @ Toronto
| 
| Antawn Jamison (19)
| Anderson Varejão (13)
| Kyrie Irving (4)
| Air Canada Centre14,468
| 3–3
|- bgcolor=#ccffcc
| 7
| January 6
| @ Minnesota
| 
| Antawn Jamison (22)
| Anderson Varejão (12)
| Ramon Sessions (6)
| Target Center16,943
| 4–3
|- bgcolor=#ffcccc
| 8
| January 8
| @ Portland
| 
| Kyrie Irving (21)
| Antawn Jamison (11)
| Kyrie Irving (4)
| Rose Garden20,292
| 4–4
|- bgcolor=#ffcccc
| 9
| January 10
| @ Utah
| 
| Antawn Jamison (22)
| Anderson Varejão (11)
| Kyrie Irving (5)
| EnergySolutions Arena  17,879
| 4–5
|- bgcolor=#ccffcc
| 10
| January 12
| @ Phoenix
| 
| Kyrie Irving (26)
| Anderson Varejão (17)
| Kyrie Irving (6)
| US Airways Center  14,636
| 5–5
|- bgcolor=#ffcccc
| 11
| January 13
| @ L. A. Lakers
| 
| Kyrie Irving (21)
| Anderson Varejão (14)
| Anthony Parker (5)
| Staples Center  18,997
| 5–6
|- bgcolor=#ccffcc
| 12
| January 16
| @ Charlotte
| 
| Kyrie Irving (25)
| Anderson Varejão (12)
| Ramon Sessions (9)
| Time Warner Cable Arena  14,988
| 6–6
|- bgcolor=#ffcccc
| 13
| January 17
| Golden State
| 
| Antawn Jamison (19)
| Anderson Varejão (13)
| Kyrie Irving (5)
| Quicken Loans Arena13,056
| 6–7
|- bgcolor=#ffcccc
| 14
| January 20
| Chicago
| 
| Anderson Varejão (14)
| Antawn Jamison (8)
| Anthony Parker, Kyrie Irving, Ramon Sessions (3)
| Quicken Loans Arena17,871
| 6–8
|- bgcolor=#ffcccc
| 15
| January 21, 2012
| @ Atlanta
| 
| Kyrie Irving (18)
| Anderson Varejão (8)
| Ramon Sessions (4)
| Philips Arena15,922
| 6–9
|- bgcolor=#ffcccc
| 16
| January 24
| @ Miami
| 
| Kyrie Irving (17)
| Anderson Varejão (11)
| Kyrie Irving, Antawn Jamison (4)
| American Airlines Arena19,600
| 6–10
|- bgcolor=#ccffcc
| 17
| January 25
| New York
| 
| Antawn Jamison (15)
| Anderson Varejão (16)
| Kyrie Irving (7)
| Quicken Loans Arena16,760
| 7–10
|- bgcolor=#ffcccc
| 18
| January 27
| New Jersey
| 
| Kyrie Irving (32)
| Anderson Varejão (9)
| Daniel Gibson (4)
| Quicken Loans Arena13,121
| 7–11
|- bgcolor=#ccffcc
| 19
| January 29
| @ Boston
| 
| Kyrie Irving (23)
| Anderson Varejão (9)
| Kyrie Irving (6)
| TD Garden18,624
| 8–11
|- bgcolor=#ffcccc
| 20
| January 31
| Boston
| 
| Kyrie Irving (21)
| Anderson Varejão (20)
| Ramon Sessions (10)
| Quicken Loans Arena14,798
| 8–12

|- bgcolor=#ffcccc
| 21
| February 3
| @ Orlando
| 
| Alonzo Gee (20)
| Anderson Varejão (15)
| Ramon Sessions (8)
| Amway Center18,933
| 8–13
|- bgcolor=#ccffcc
| 22
| February 4
| Dallas
| 
| Kyrie Irving (20)
| Anderson Varejão (17)
| Ramon Sessions (8)
| Quicken Loans Arena17,433
| 9–13
|- bgcolor=#ffcccc
| 23
| February 7
| @ Miami
| 
| Antawn Jamison (25)
| Anderson Varejão (11)
| Kyrie Irving (6)
| American Airlines Arena20,078
| 9–14
|- bgcolor=#ccffcc
| 24
| February 8
| L. A. Clippers
| 
| Antawn Jamison (27)
| Anderson Varejão (11)
| Ramon Sessions (13)
| Quicken Loans Arena17,100
| 10–14
|- bgcolor=#ffcccc
| 25
| February 10
| Milwaukee
| 
| Antawn Jamison (34)
| Tristan Thompson (13)
| Ramon Sessions (16)
| Quicken Loans Arena15,195
| 10–15
|- bgcolor=#ffcccc
| 26
| February 11
| Philadelphia
| 
| Antawn Jamison (20)
| Antawn Jamison (8)
| Ramon Sessions (8)
| Quicken Loans Arena
| 10–16
|- bgcolor=#ccffcc
| 27
| February 15
| Indiana
| 
| Kyrie Irving (22)
| David West (10)
| Kyrie Irving (5)
| Quicken Loans Arena
| 11–16
|- bgcolor=#ffcccc
| 28
| February 17
| Miami
| 
| LeBron James (28)
| Chris Bosh (12)
| LeBron James (5)
| Quicken Loans Arena
| 11–17
|- bgcolor=#ccffcc
| 29
| February 19
| Sacramento
| 
| Kyrie Irving (23)
| Omri Casspi (12)
| Isaiah Thomas (11)
| Quicken Loans Arena
| 12–17
|- bgcolor=#ccffcc
| 30
| February 21
| Detroit
| 
| Antawn Jamison (32)
| Alonzo Gee (11)
| Kyrie Irving (8)
| Quicken Loans Arena
| 13–17
|- bgcolor=#ffcccc
| 31
| February 22
| New Orleans
| 
| Antawn Jamison (22)
| Gustavo Ayon (17)
| Kyrie Irving (11)
| Quicken Loans Arena
| 13–18
|- align="center"
|colspan="9" bgcolor="#bbcaff"|All-Star Break
|- bgcolor=#ffcccc
| 32
| February 28
| Boston
| 
| Kyrie Irving (24)
| Chris Wilcox (11)
| Rajon Rondo (11
| Quicken Loans Arena
| 13–19
|- bgcolor=#ffcccc
| 33
| February 29
| @ New York
| 
| Antawn Jamison (23)
| Tyson Chandler (15)
| Jeremy Lin (13)
| Madison Square Garden
| 13–20

|- bgcolor=#ffcccc
| 34
| March 2
| Chicago
| 
| Luol Deng (24)
| Carlos Boozer (11)
| Derrick Rose (9)
| Quicken Loans Arena
| 13–21
|- bgcolor=#ffcccc
| 35
| March 3
| @ Washington
| 
| Jordan Crawford (31)
| JaVale McGee (12)
| Kyrie Irving (6)
| Verizon Center
| 13–22
|- bgcolor=#ffcccc
| 36
| March 5
| Utah
| 
| Antawn Jamison, Kyrie Irving (22)
| Five players (4)
| Antawn Jamison (6)
| Quicken Loans Arena13,190
| 13–23
|- bgcolor=#ccffcc
| 37
| March 7
| @ Denver
| 
| Antawn Jamison (33)
| Antawn Jamison (9)
| Kyrie Irving (8)
| Power Balance Pavilion15,816
| 14–23
|- bgcolor=#ccffcc
| 38
| March 9
| @ Oklahoma City
| 
| Antawn Jamison (21)
| Three players (8)
| Kyrie Irving (12)
| Chesapeake Energy Arena18,203
| 15–23
|- bgcolor=#ccffcc
| 39
| March 11
| Houston
| 
| Antawn Jamison (28)
| Kyrie Irving (6)
| Ramon Sessions (7)
| Quicken Loans Arena17,662
| 16–23
|- bgcolor=#ffcccc
| 40
| March 13
| Toronto
| 
| Antawn Jamison (20)
| Kyrie Irving (7)
| Kyrie Irving (7)
| Quicken Loans Arena14,203
| 16–24
|- bgcolor=#ffcccc
| 41
| March 14
| @ Milwaukee
| 
| Kyrie Irving (28)
| Alonzo GeeAntawn Jamison (5)
| Ramon Sessions (6)
| Bradley Center15,319
| 16–25
|- bgcolor=#ffcccc
| 42
| March 18
| Atlanta
| 
| Alonzo Gee (20)
| Alonzo Gee (9)
| Kyrie Irving (10)
| Quicken Loans Arena15,645
| 16–26
|- bgcolor=#ccffcc
| 43
| March 19
| @ New Jersey
| 
| Tristan Thompson (27)
| Antawn Jamison (13)
| Kyrie Irving (7)
| Prudential Center11,254
| 17–26
|- bgcolor=#ffcccc
| 44
| March 21
| @ Atlanta
| 
| Kyrie Irving (29)
| Alonzo Gee (13)
| Kyrie Irving (9)
| Philips Arena12,331
| 17–27
|- bgcolor=#ffcccc
| 45
| March 23
| @ Orlando
| 
| Antawn Jamison (16)
| Tristan Thompson (11)
| Kyrie Irving (6)
| Amway Center18,846
| 17–28
|- bgcolor=#ffcccc
| 46
| March 25
| Phoenix
| 
| Kyrie Irving (16)
| Manny Harris (9)
| Kyrie IrvingDonald Sloan (4)
| Quicken Loans Arena17,307
| 17–29
|- bgcolor=#ffcccc
| 47
| March 27
| @ Philadelphia
| 
| Anthony Parker (14)
| Alonzo Gee (9)
| Kyrie Irving (7)
| Wells Fargo Center17,832
| 17–30
|- bgcolor=#ffcccc
| 48
| March 28
| Detroit
| 
| Kyrie Irving (22)
| Tristan Thompson (11)
| Kyrie Irving (6)
| Quicken Loans Arena14,486
| 17–31
|- bgcolor=#ffcccc
| 49
| March 30
| Milwaukee
| 
| Kyrie Irving (29)
| Tristan Thompson (11)
| Kyrie Irving (5)
| Quicken Loans Arena16,099
| 17–32
|- bgcolor=#ffcccc
| 50
| March 31
| @ New York
| 
| Antawn Jamison (13)
| Antawn JamisonDonald Sloan (7)
| Donald Sloan (4)
| Madison Square Garden19,763
| 17–33

|- bgcolor=#ffcccc
| 51
| April 3
| San Antonio
| 
| Antawn Jamison (15)
| Alonzo Gee (5)
| Kyrie IrvingLuke Walton (5)
| Quicken Loans Arena14,759
| 17–34
|- bgcolor=#ffcccc
| 52
| April 4
| @ Milwaukee
| 
| Anthony Parker (27)
| Tristan Thompson (9)
| Donald Sloan (8)
| Bradley Center11,849
| 17–35
|- bgcolor=#ccffcc
| 53
| April 6
| @ Toronto
| 
| Antawn Jamison (25)
| Antawn Jamison (8)
| Lester Hudson (7)
| Air Canada Centre16,565
| 18–35
|- bgcolor=#ffcccc
| 54
| April 8
| @ New Jersey
| 
| Antawn Jamison (34)
| Tristan Thompson (15)
| Donald Sloan (14)
| Prudential Center11,341
| 18–36
|- bgcolor=#ccffcc
| 55
| April 10
| Charlotte
| 
| Lester Hudson (25)
| Lester Hudson (8)
| Lester Hudson (6)
| Quicken Loans Arena13,576
| 19–36
|- bgcolor=#ffcccc
| 56
| April 11
| Indiana
| 
| Antawn Jamison (21)
| Antawn JamisonTristan Thompson (8)
| Donald Sloan (6)
| Quicken Loans Arena14,307
| 19–37
|- bgcolor=#ffcccc
| 57
| April 13
| @ Indiana
| 
| Omri Casspi (14)
| Samardo Samuels (10)
| Donald Sloan (5)
| Bankers Life Fieldhouse13,356
| 19–38
|- bgcolor=#ccffcc
| 58
| April 14
| @ Washington
| 
| Luke Harangody (16)
| Luke Harangody (10)
| Anthony Parker (5)
| Verizon Center17,200
| 20–38
|- bgcolor=#ffcccc
| 59
| April 15
| Orlando
| 
| Antawn Jamison (21)
| Alonzo GeeTristan Thompson (8)
| Antawn Jamison (6)
| Quicken Loans Arena16,305
| 20–39
|- bgcolor=#ffcccc
| 60
| April 17
| @ Detroit
| 
| Manny Harris (18)
| Tristan Thompson (13)
| Donald Sloan (4)
| The Palace of Auburn Hills11,595
| 20–40
|- bgcolor=#ffcccc
| 61
| April 18
| Philadelphia
| 
| Samardo SamuelsLester Hudson (15)
| Samardo SamuelsTristan Thompson (5)
| Donald Sloan (7)
| Quicken Loans Arena14,678
| 20–41
|- bgcolor=#ccffcc
| 62
| April 20
| New York
| 
| Kyrie Irving (21)
| Manny Harris (12)
| Antawn Jamison (5)
| Quicken Loans Arena19,349
| 21–41
|- bgcolor=#ffcccc
| 63
| April 22
| @ San Antonio
| 
| Antawn Jamison (21)
| Tristan Thompson (9)
| Anthony Parker (4)
| AT&T Center18,581
| 21–42
|- bgcolor=#ffcccc
| 64
| April 23
| @ Memphis
| 
| Kyrie Irving (25)
| Antawn JamisonTristan Thompson (9)
| Kyrie Irving (4)
| FedExForum15,504
| 21–43
|- bgcolor=#ffcccc
| 65
| April 25
| Washington
| 
| D.J. Kennedy (12)
| Samardo Samuels (9)
| Donald Sloan (7)
| Quicken Loans Arena18,086
| 21–44
|- bgcolor=#ffcccc
| 66
| April 26
| @ Chicago
| 
| Tristan Thompson (13)
| Tristan Thompson (12)
| Donald SloanLuke Walton (2)
| United Center22,563
| 21–45

All the games through December 24 were canceled due to the 2011 NBA Lockout. A new schedule was created starting in December 25.

Player statistics

Regular season

|- align="center" bgcolor=""
|
| 51 || 51 || 30.5 || .469 || .399 ||style="background:#FCC200;color:#B3121D;" |.872 || 3.7 ||style="background:#FCC200;color:#B3121D;" |5.4 || 1.1 || .4 ||style="background:#FCC200;color:#B3121D;" |18.5
|- align="center" bgcolor="ffffff"
|
|style="background:#FCC200;color:#B3121D;" |65 ||style="background:#FCC200;color:#B3121D;" |65 ||style="background:#FCC200;color:#B3121D;" |33.1 || .403 || .341 || .683 || 6.3 || 2.0 || .8 || .7 || 17.2
|- align="center" bgcolor=""
| 
| 13 || 0 || 24.2 || .391 || .246 || .842 || 3.5 || 2.7 || 1.1 || .2 || 12.7
|- align="center" bgcolor="ffffff"
|
| 25 || 25 || 31.4 || .514 || .000 || .672 ||style="background:#FCC200;color:#B3121D;" |11.5 || 1.7 ||style="background:#FCC200;color:#B3121D;" |1.4 || .7 || 10.8
|- align="center" bgcolor=""
| 
| 63 || 31 || 29.0 || .412 || .321 || .788 || 5.1 || 1.8 || 1.3 || .3 || 10.6
|- align="center" bgcolor="ffffff"
| 
| 41 || 4 || 24.5 || .398 || .419 || .830 || 3.1 || 5.2 || .7 || .0 || 10.5
|- align="center" bgcolor=""
| 
| 60 || 25 || 23.7 || .439 || .000 || .552 || 6.5 || .5 || .5 ||style="background:#FCC200;color:#B3121D;" |1.0 || 8.2
|- align="center" bgcolor="ffffff"
| 
| 35 || 7 || 26.2 || .351 || .396 || .791 || 2.9 || 2.2 || .7 || .5 || 7.5
|- align="center" bgcolor=""
|
| 51 || 51 || 25.1 || .433 || .362 || .625 || 2.7 || 2.4 || .7 || .1 || 7.2
|- align="center" bgcolor="ffffff"
|
|style="background:#FCC200;color:#B3121D;" |65 || 35 || 20.6 || .403 || .315 || .685 || 3.5 || 1.0 || .6 || .3 || 7.1
|- align="center" bgcolor=""
| 
| 26 || 5 || 17.5 || .400 || .333 || .695 || 2.7 || 1.2 || .5 || .2 || 6.7
|- align="center" bgcolor="ffffff"
| 
| 25 || 11 || 24.3 || .403 || .091 || .808 || 2.4 || 3.7 || .4 || .1 || 6.6
|- align="center" bgcolor=""
| 
| 2 || 0 || 29.5 || .417 ||style="background:#FCC200;color:#B3121D;" |.500 || .000 || 3.5 || 1.5 || 1.0 || .0 || 6.0
|- align="center" bgcolor="ffffff"
| 
| 54 || 0 || 15.3 || .455 ||  || .701 || 3.3 || .4 || .4 || .4 || 5.4
|- align="center" bgcolor=""
| 
| 24 || 7 || 15.1 || .500 ||  || .600 || 2.3 || .3 || .2 || .5 || 3.7
|- align="center" bgcolor="ffffff"
| 
| 5 || 3 || 19.0 || .292 || .364 ||  || 1.0 || 1.4 || .4 || .2 || 3.6
|- align="center" bgcolor=""
| 
| 28 || 9 || 11.9 ||style="background:#FCC200;color:#B3121D;" |.527 ||  || .512 || 2.6 || .3 || .4 || .2 || 3.5
|- align="center" bgcolor="ffffff"
| 
| 21 || 1 || 11.0 || .354 || .238 || .750 || 2.5 || .3 || .3 || .1 || 2.9
|- align="center" bgcolor=""
| 
| 2 || 0 || 6.5 || .400 ||  ||  || 2.0 || 1.0 || .5 || .0 || 2.0
|- align="center" bgcolor="ffffff"
| 
| 21 || 0 || 14.2 || .353 || .438 ||  || 1.7 || 1.4 || .1 || .0 || 2.0
|- align="center" bgcolor=""
| 
| 6 || 0 || 13.8 || .158 || .500 || .333 || 2.0 || .7 || .5 || .7 || 1.5
|}

Awards, records and milestones

Awards
 Kyrie Irving was named Eastern Conference Rookie of the Month three times (December – January, February and March) and won the NBA Rookie of the Year Award.
 Rookies Kyrie Irving and Tristan Thompson were selected to participate in the 2012 Rising Stars challenge.

Milestones
 On March 31 Antawn Jamison scored his 19,000th career point in a 75–91 loss to the New York Knicks.
 On January 31 Kyrie Irving made his first game-winning basket against the Boston Celtics.

Injuries, surgeries and absences
 Semih Erden had a fracture in his right thumb and missed the first seven games of the regular season. In April, he sprained his right ankle and missed the remainder of the season.
 Kyrie Irving suffered a concussion during a game against the Miami Heat on February 7 and missed the following 3 games.
 Anderson Varejão broke his wrist on February 10 during a game against the Milwaukee Bucks and missed the remainder of the season.

Transactions

Free agents

Additions

Subtractions

Trades

References

External links
 

Cleveland Cavaliers seasons
Cleveland
Cleve
Cleve